Khdrants is a village in the Kapan Municipality of the Syunik Province in Armenia.

Etymology 
The village is also known as Khdran, Khndrats’i and Khotorants’ and has previously been known as Sirkatag, Sirbat’as, Surbyadag, Sirkat’as, and Tsakghadzor.

Demographics 
The Statistical Committee of Armenia reported its population as 55 in 2010, down from 68 at the 2001 census.

References 

Populated places in Syunik Province